was a Japanese basketball player. He competed in the men's tournament at the 1972 Summer Olympics.

He died on 3 May 2021 in Toride from pancreatic cancer.

References

External links
 

1946 births
2021 deaths
Japanese men's basketball players
1967 FIBA World Championship players
Olympic basketball players of Japan
Basketball players at the 1972 Summer Olympics
Basketball players from Tokyo
Asian Games medalists in basketball
Asian Games bronze medalists for Japan
Basketball players at the 1970 Asian Games
Medalists at the 1970 Asian Games